The bouba/kiki effect is a non-arbitrary mapping between speech sounds and the visual shape of objects. It was first documented by Wolfgang Köhler in 1929 using nonsense words. The effect has been observed in American university students, Tamil speakers in India, young children, and infants, and has also been shown to occur with familiar names. It is absent in individuals who are congenitally blind. The effect was investigated using fMRI in 2018. The bouba/kiki effect is one form of sound symbolism.

Research

Discovery
This effect was first observed by Georgian psychologist Dimitri Uznadze in a 1924 paper. He conducted an experiment with 10 participants who were given a list with nonsense words, shown 6 drawings for 5 seconds each, then had to pick a name for the drawing from the list of given words. He describes the different "strategies" participants developed to match words to drawings and quotes their reasoning. He also describes situations where participants described very specific forms that they associated with a nonsense word, without reference to the shown drawings. He develops a theory of four factors that influence the way names for objects are decided.

In total there were 42 words. For one particular drawing, 45% picked the same word. For three others, the percentages were 40%. Uznadze points out that this is significantly more overlap than one could expect, given the high number of possible words. He speculates that there must therefore be certain regularities "which the human soul follows in the process of name-giving". 

German American psychologist Wolfgang Köhler referred to Uznadze's experiment in a 1929 book which showed 2 forms and asked readers which shape was called "takete" and which was called "maluma". Although not explicitly stated, Köhler implies that there is a strong preference to pair the jagged shape with "takete" and the rounded shape with "maluma".

Extension to other contexts
In 2001, V. S. Ramachandran and Edward Hubbard repeated Köhler's experiment using the words "kiki" and "bouba" and asked American college undergraduates and Tamil speakers in India, "Which of these shapes is bouba and which is kiki?" In both groups, 95% to 98% selected the curvy shape as "bouba" and the jagged one as "kiki", suggesting that the human brain somehow attaches abstract meanings to the shapes and sounds consistently.

Daphne Maurer and colleagues showed that even children as young as 2 years old may show this preference. More recent work by Ozge Ozturk and colleagues in 2013 showed that even 4-month-old infants have the same sound–shape mapping biases as adults and toddlers. Infants are able to differentiate between congruent trials (pairing an angular shape with "kiki" or a curvy shape with "bubu") and incongruent trials (pairing a curvy shape with "kiki" or an angular shape with "bubu"). Infants looked longer at incongruent pairings than at congruent pairings. Infants' mapping was based on the combination of consonants and vowels in the words, and neither consonants nor vowels alone sufficed for mapping. These results suggest that some sound–shape mappings precede language learning, and may in fact aid in language learning by establishing a basis for matching labels to referents and narrowing the hypothesis space for young infants. Adults in this study, like infants, used a combination of consonant and vowel information to match the labels they heard with the shapes they saw. However, this was not the only strategy that was available to them. Adults, unlike infants, were also able to use consonant information alone and vowel information alone to match the labels to the shapes, albeit less frequently than the consonant–vowel combination. When vowels and consonants were put in conflict, adults used consonants more often than vowels.

The effect has also been shown to emerge in other contexts, such as when words are paired with evaluative meanings (with "bouba" words associated with positive concepts and "kiki" words associated with negative concepts) or when the words to be paired are existing first names, suggesting that some familiarity with the linguistic stimuli does not eliminate the effect. A study showed that individuals will pair names such as "Molly" with round silhouettes, and names such as "Kate" with sharp silhouettes. Moreover, individuals will associate different personality traits with either group of names (e.g., easygoingness with "round names"; determination with "sharp names"). This may hint at a role of abstract concepts in the effect.

Contexts where the effect is smaller or absent
Other research suggests that this effect does not occur in all communities, and it appears that the effect breaks if the sounds do not make licit words in the language. The bouba/kiki effect seems to be dependent on a long sensitive period, with high visual capacities in childhood being necessary for its typical development. In contrast to typically sighted individuals, congenitally blind individuals have been reported not to show a systematic bouba/kiki effect for touched shapes.

Neuroscience
In 2019, Nathan Peiffer-Smadja and Laurent Cohen published the first study using fMRI to explore the bouba/kiki effect. They found that prefrontal activation is stronger to mismatching (bouba with spiky shape) than to matching (bouba with round shape) stimuli. A subsequent study by Kelly McCormick and colleagues reported a similar pattern of greater activation for mismatched word-shape stimuli, but with most activity in parietal regions including the intraparietal sulcus and supramarginal gyrus, regions known to play a role in sensory association and perceptual-motor processing. Peiffer-Smadja and Cohen also found that sound-shape matching also influences activations in the auditory and visual cortices, suggesting an effect of matching at an early stage in sensory processing.

Implications for understanding language
Ramachandran and Hubbard suggest that the kiki/bouba effect has implications for the evolution of language, because it suggests that the naming of objects is not completely arbitrary. The rounded shape may most commonly be named "bouba" because the mouth makes a more rounded shape to produce that sound while a more taut, angular mouth shape is needed to make the sounds in "kiki". Alternatively, the distinction may be between coronal or dorsal consonants like /k/ and labial consonants like /b/. Additionally, it was shown that it is not only different consonants (e.g., voiceless versus voiced) and different vowel qualities (e.g., /a/ versus /i/) that play a role in the effect, but also vowel quantity (long versus short vowels). In one study, participants rated words containing long vowels to refer to longer objects and short vowels to short objects, at least for languages that make a vowel length distinction.  The presence of these "synesthesia-like mappings" suggest that this effect might be the neurological basis for sound symbolism, in which sounds are non-arbitrarily mapped to objects and events in the world. Research has also indicated that the effect may be a case of ideasthesia, a phenomenon in which activations of concepts (inducers) evoke perception-like experiences (concurrents). The name comes from the Greek idea and aisthesis, meaning "sensing concepts" or "sensing ideas", and was introduced by Danko Nikolić.

See also
 Color symbolism
 Japanese sound symbolism
 Origin of language
 Semiotics
 Universal language

References

Cognitive science
Psycholinguistics
Phonaesthetics